Blatten may refer to:

 Blatten bei Naters, a ski resort and village in the municipality of Naters in the Swiss canton of Valais
 Blatten (Lötschen), a village and municipality in the Lötschental valley in the Swiss canton of Valais
 Blatten (Lucerne), a hamlet in the municipality of Malters in the Swiss canton of Lucerne